Sorocea sarcocarpa is a species of plant in the family Moraceae. It is endemic to Ecuador.

References

Endemic flora of Ecuador
sarcocarpa
Endangered plants
Taxonomy articles created by Polbot